Polyubiquitin-C is a protein encoded by the UBC gene in humans. Polyubiquitin-C is one of the sources of ubiquitin, along with UBB, UBA52, and RPS27A.

UBC gene is one of the two stress-regulated polyubiquitin genes (UBB and UBC) in mammals. It plays a key role in maintaining cellular ubiquitin levels under stress conditions. Defects of UBC gene could lead to mid-gestation embryonic lethality.

Structure

Gene
UBC gene is located at chromosome 12q24.3, consisting of 2 exons. The promoter of the UBC gene contains putative heat shock elements (HSEs), which mediates UBC induction upon stress. UBC gene differs from UBB gene in the number of Ub coding units they contain. Nine to ten Ub units were in the UBC gene.

Protein
In polyubiquitin-C, the C-terminus of a given ubiquitin molecule is covalently conjugated to either the N-terminal residue or one of seven lysine residues of another ubiquitin molecule. Different linking of ubiquitin chains results in distinct conformations. There are 8 linkage types of polyubiquitin-C, and each type possesses the linkage-dependent dynamics and a linkage-specific conformation.

Function 
The diversity of polyubiquitin-C means that ubiquitylation contributes to the regulation of many cellular events. Polyubiquitin-C doesn’t activate the heat-shock response, but it plays a key role in sustaining the response. UBC gene transcription is induced during stress and provides extra ubiquitin necessary to remove damaged/unfolded proteins. Polyubiquitin-C has important role in diverse biological processes, such as innate immunity, DNA repair and kinase activity. Unanchored polyubiquitin-C are also key signaling molecules that connect and coordinate the proteasome and autophagy to eliminate toxic protein aggregates.

Clinical significance
Loss of a single UBC allele has no apparent phenotype, while homozygous deletion of UBC gene leads to mid-gestation embryonic lethality due to a defect in fetal liver development, as well as a delay in cell-cycle progression and increased susceptibility to cellular stress. It is also reported that homozygous deletion of UBC gene in mouse embryonic fibroblasts will cause decreased cellular Ub level and reduced viability under oxidative stress.

Interactions 

Polyubiquitin-C has been shown to interact with:

 BIRC2, 
 BSG, 
 CDC2, 
 CFAP298, 
 E2F1, 
 EGFR, 
 HDAC3, 
 HIF1A, 
 IRAK1, 
 KIAA0753.
 MARK4, 
 MDM2, 
 NDUFA3,
 NFE2L2, 
 NOTCH1, 
 NUAK1, 
 OPRK1, 
 P53,
 PCNA 
 PARK2, 
 RIPK1, 
 RPS6KB1, 
 S100A10, 
 SCNN1A, 
 SCNN1G, 
 SFPQ, 
 SMAD3, 
 SMURF2, 
 SP1, 
 TRAF6,  and
 THRA.

References

Further reading 

 
 
 
 
 
 
 
 
 
 
 
 
 
 
 
 
 

Human proteins